Hard Drive is the debut album from York rock band The Sorry Kisses, which was released on 28 April 2008.
The album has been created as an outlet for Hayley Hutchinson's louder songs, which contrast with her usual acoustic style. The album was released exclusively online on a limited run of 100 handmade copies, but is currently only available on iTunes.
All songs feature Hayley Hutchinson on lead vocals and Sam Forrest on backing vocals, except "Painted Doll" which features Sam and Hayley's roles reversed, and "I Want You Now" in which both share lead.

Track listing
"I Want You Now" – 3.59
"No Logic" – 3.14
"Complexity Of A Life" – 3.22
"In Your Car" – 3.25
"Living A Lie" – 3.48
"Saying Sorry" – 3.44
"Painted Doll" – 4.07
"Death Of A Whale" – 0.42
"A Long Way From Home" – 3.27
"Running Out" – 3.45
"I Knew Him All Along" – 4.08
"Think Twice" – 4.41

All songs by Hayley Hutchinson/Sam Forrest.

2008 albums